Journey to the Center of the Earth (French title Voyage au centre de la Terre) is an 1864 science fiction novel by Jules Verne.

Journey to the Center of the Earth may also refer to:

Film and television
Journey to the Center of the Earth (1959 film), film starring James Mason, Pat Boone, and Arlene Dahl
Journey to the Center of the Earth (TV series), 1967 animated ABC series based on the 1959 film
A Journey to the Center of the Earth (1977 film), a 1977 Australian animated TV film
Viaje al centro de la Tierra, a 1977 Spanish film starring Kenneth More, released in the US as Where Time Began and on UK television as The Fabulous Journey to the Centre of the Earth
Journey to the Center of the Earth (1989 film), a sequel to the movie Alien from L.A.
Journey to the Center of the Earth (1993 film), TV film featuring Carel Struycken, Tim Russ, and Jeffrey Nordling
Journey to the Center of the Earth (miniseries), 1999 miniseries starring Treat Williams and Bryan Brown
Journey to the Center of the Earth (2008 TV film), 2008 TV film featuring Rick Schroder
Journey to the Center of the Earth (2008 direct-to-video film), 2008 film produced by The Asylum
Journey to the Center of the Earth (2008 theatrical film), 2008 film adaptation of the novel with 3-D elements, starring Brendan Fraser, Josh Hutcherson, and Anita Briem

Video games 

 A Journey to the Centre of the Earth (1984 video game), a side-scrolling action-adventure platform game
 Journey to the Center of the Earth (2003 video game)
 Journey to the Center of the Earth (2008 video game), video game adaptation of the 2008 movie for the Nintendo DS

Other uses
Journey to the Centre of the Earth (album), 1974 progressive rock concept album by Rick Wakeman
Journey to the Center of the Earth (attraction), attraction at Tokyo DisneySea that plays into the Jules Verne story
Voyage au centre de la Terre, 1821 novel by Jacques Collin de Plancy

See also
Travel to the Earth's center, science fiction theme